"(I'm So) Happy Happy (You're Mine)" is the only single from the British girl group, The Sheilas, released on 17 (download) and 24 September (CD), 2007.

The Sheila's were a novelty group, created from session singers to promote Sheilas' Wheels, which advertised on ITV Weather in the United Kingdom. The song lyrics include many references to this, for example, "You're my blue sky and sunshine", "Everybody wants the sun, nobody wants the rain" and "You can bring about a change in the weather".

Track listing

Promo CD
 "Radio Edit"
 "Extended Mix"
 "Riff & Rays Extended Mix"
 "Riff & Rays Radio Edit"

Charts
 UK Singles Chart - #91

References

2007 singles
Songs written by Mike Stock (musician)
2007 songs
EMI Records singles